is a town located in Niigata Prefecture, Japan. , the town had an estimated population of 4,190, and a population density of 94.4 persons per km².

Geography
Izumozaki is located in a coastal region of central Niigata Prefecture bordered by the Sea of Japan to the west.

Surrounding municipalities
Niigata Prefecture
Nagaoka
Kashiwazaki

Climate
Izumozaki has a humid climate (Köppen Cfa) characterized by warm, wet summers and cold winters with heavy snowfall.  The average annual temperature in Izumozaki is 12.6 °C. The average annual rainfall is 2261 mm with September as the wettest month. The temperatures are highest on average in August, at around 25.7 °C, and lowest in January, at around 0.7 °C.

Demographics
Per Japanese census data, the population of Izumozaki has declined steadily over the past 50 years.

History
The area of present-day Izumozaki was part of ancient Echigo Province. During the Edo period, it was tenryō territory controlled directly by the Tokygawa shogunate, and the location of the Izumozaki daikansho. The great Zen poet and calligrapher Ryōkan was born in Izumozaki in 1758. After the start of the Meiji period, the area was organised into  Santō District, Niigata, and the town of Izumozaki was established on April 1, 1886 with the creation of the modern municipalities system. Om April 1, 1904, Izumozaki annexed the neighbouring town of Amaze. Izumozaki merged with the neighbouring village of Nishikoshi on June 20, 1957.

Economy
Commercial fishing dominates the local economy. A large percentage of the working population commutes to neighbouring Nagaoka or Kashiwazaki.

Education
Izumozaki has one public elementary school and one public middle school operated the town government. The town has  one public high school operated by the Niigata Prefectural Board of Education..

Transportation

Railway
 – Echigo Line
  -

Highway

References

External links

Official Website 

Towns in Niigata Prefecture
Populated coastal places in Japan
Izumozaki, Niigata